Polichna is a village in Poland.

Polichna may also refer to:
Polichna (Clazomenae), a town in ancient Ionia near Clazomenae, now in Turkey
Polichna (Crete), a town in eastern ancient Crete, Greece
Polichna (Ionia), a town in ancient Ionia, now in Turkey
Polichna (Laconia), a town in ancient Laconia, Greece
Polichna (Megaris), a town in ancient Megaris, Greece
Polichna (Messenia), a town in ancient Messenia, Greece
Polichna (Troad), a town in the ancient Troad, now in Turkey
Polichna (Western Crete), a town in western ancient Crete, Greece

See also
Polichne (disambiguation)